Class 31 may refer to:

British Rail Class 31
EAR 31 class
GER Class N31
HSH Class 31
L&YR Class 31
NBR Class M 4-4-0, later LNER Class D31
No.31-class patrol boat
Seibu Class E31
South African Class 31-000